Joseph Mahmud is a Belizean politician and a member of the People's United Party (PUP). He was elected March 2012 as Area Representative for the Cayo North constituency in the Cayo District.

In November 2014 Mahmud unexpectedly resigned from the Belize House, becoming the first Belize House member since independence to voluntarily resign mid-term. A by-election in Cayo North to determine Mahmud's successor was held on 5 January 2015. Mahmud had previously indicated he would stand down at the 2015 general election.

References

External links
https://archive.today/20121130132924/http://www.nationalassembly.gov.bz/index.php/hor-lowerhouse/69-members-of-the-house/117-hon-joseph-mahmud
https://web.archive.org/web/20140409012105/http://www.pup.org.bz/leaders/standard-bearers/

Living people
Year of birth missing (living people)
Belizean people of Lebanese descent
People's United Party politicians
Members of the Belize House of Representatives for Cayo North